

The ANF Les Mureaux 140T was a French postal monoplane first flown in September 1932. It was a high-wing monoplane powered by three  Salmson 9Ac radial engines. It had room for six passengers or four plus freight or mail but it did not enter production.

Specification

References

Bibliography

1930s French civil utility aircraft
140
Abandoned civil aircraft projects
Trimotors
High-wing aircraft
Aircraft first flown in 1932